The 2018 Sun Belt Conference women's soccer tournament was the postseason women's soccer tournament for the Sun Belt Conference held from October 31 to November 4, 2018. The seven-match tournament took place at the Foley Sports Complex in Foley, Alabama. The eight-team single-elimination tournament consisted of three rounds based on seeding from regular season conference play. The defending champions were the South Alabama Jaguars, however they were unable to defend their title, losing in a penalty kick shootout to the Texas State Bobcats in the semifinals.  The Arkansas-Little Rock Trojans won the title in another penalty kick shootout over Texas State. This was the first Sun Belt women's soccer tournament title for Little Rock and the first for head coach Mark Foster.

Bracket

Source:

Schedule

Quarterfinals

Semifinals

Final

Statistics

Goalscorers 
2 Goals
 Kaylee Davis – Texas State
 Jaclyn Purvine – Little Rock

1 Goal
 Lily Barron – Georgia State
 Hailey Furio  – Arkansas State
 Abby Gashel – Coastal Carolina
 Ana Helmert - South Alabama
 Hannah Miller – Coastal Carolina
 Abi Mills - South Alabama
 Briana Morris - South Alabama
 Moa Ohman - South Alabama
 Caitlin Ray – Georgia State
 Liesa Seifert  – Little Rock

All-Tournament team

Source:

See also 
 2018 Sun Belt Conference Men's Soccer Tournament

References 

Sun Belt Conference Women's Soccer Tournament
2018 Sun Belt Conference women's soccer season
Women's sports in Alabama